Shakka Philip (born 16 May 1989), known simply as Shakka, is a British singer, songwriter and record producer signed to Pitched Up, Columbia Records and Sony Music.

Shakka released his debut major label EP The Lost Boys in 2015 which included the hit "Say Nada", with the official video (featuring Jme) having been viewed by over five million people, earning him his first MOBO Award for Best R&B/Soul Act. In 2016, he returned with the follow-up EP, The Island, which earned Shakka his second MOBO Award for Best R&B/Soul Act alongside a spot in The Independents Ones to Watch 2017 list.

Career

2009–2011: Early projects and Shakkapellas
Shakka self-released his first official EP, Foolishness, in July 2009 which was recorded at a local youth centre. With production from both Shakka and TE1, this was Shakka's introduction into the music industry. Shakka consciously decided to sing with his British accent as opposed to an American-influenced accent that many of his contemporaries were using at the time and this formed part of his trademark sound.

He then went on to release a conceptual mixtape, The Shakka Crown Affair, in 2011 which gained Shakka much respect amongst his peers, solidified him as an emerging creative phenomenon in the UK and brought him to the attention of successful British rapper Wretch 32.

Having developed a fanbase in the UK, Shakka went on to release a series of YouTube covers and mashups entitled Shakkapellas in 2012 which gained him fans globally and put him on the radar of music industry tastemakers.

2013–2014: Rise to fame
2013 proved to be a successful year for Shakka, collaborating with various artists, most notably featuring on Wretch 32's single "Blackout", which reached number 6 on the UK Singles Chart. He was also selected to perform on the BBC Introducing stage at Glastonbury Festival, and then toured globally with Basement Jaxx as their guest vocalist.

This year also saw Shakka receive extensive recognition named in MTV's top 20 Unsigned Artists of 2013 list and receiving two MOBO Award nominations; including Best Newcomer. BBC's Radio 1Xtra were early champions of Shakka's music playing some of his Shakkapellas on the station and have supported him throughout his rise to fame.

Noted television performances in 2013 included performing on 'The Graham Norton Show' alongside Wretch 32, as well as on Sunday Brunch and Channel 5's The Wright Stuff.

He followed this growing success with another independent project, the Tribe EP, in 2013. In July 2013 he released the single by "Spin", taken from Tribe. In November 2013 he released the single "Just Want to See You".

In 2013 Shakka was also chosen to perform in, and produce music for, a National Theatre production called "Home" directed by Nadia Fall which ran for two months during late summer. During this production he had the pleasure of sharing the stage with Antonia Thomas (E4's Misfits) and BAFTA award-winning Michaela Coel (E4's Chewing Gum).

2015–present: Breakthrough: The Lost Boys and The Island
In 2014, Shakka released a collection of remixes aptly named Shakka B-Sides. It featured the remix of Ten Walls' "Walking with Elephants" featuring Frisco (BBK), which achieved over 8 million views on YouTube. In 2015, Shakka signed to Pitched Up/Sony Music.

In 2015, Shakka released his debut major label EP The Lost Boys and a new single entitled "Say Nada".

Shortly afterwards, he released a remix of "Say Nada" featuring two verses by Jme (BBK), which has accumulated over 5 million YouTube views. The solo version of the song features on his EP The Lost Boys, released 6 November 2015.

In 2016 he returned with the follow-up EP, The Island, which earned Shakka his second MOBO Award for Best R&B/Soul Act alongside a spot on The Independents Ones to Watch 2017 list.

Shakka featured on Ghetts' new record "Know My Ting", released on 27 January 2017 on Black Butter Records.

Shakka is also the music producer for E4's Chewing Gum TV series, which broadcast its second series in January/February 2017.

On 12 August 2021, Shakka announced the release of his debut album, Road Trip To Venus, which released on 24 September 2021.

Discography

Albums

Extended plays

Mixtapes

Singles

As lead artist

As featured artist

Guest appearances

Awards and nominations

References

External links

1989 births
Living people
21st-century Black British male singers
English people of Nigerian descent
English record producers
Musicians from London
People from Notting Hill